Piz Mingèr (3,114 m) is a mountain in the Sesvenna Range of the Alps, located west of S-charl in the canton of Graubünden. It lies on the range north of Piz Foraz, between the Val Plavna and the Val S-charl.

The east side of the mountain is part of the Swiss National Park.

References

External links
 Piz Mingèr on Hikr

Mountains of Switzerland
Mountains of Graubünden
Mountains of the Alps
Alpine three-thousanders